Smallfoot is a 2018 American computer-animated musical comedy film co-produced by Warner Animation Group and Zaftig Films, and distributed by Warner Bros. Pictures. Based on the unpublished children's book Yeti Tracks by Sergio Pablos, the film was co-written and directed by Karey Kirkpatrick, and stars the voices of Channing Tatum, James Corden, Zendaya, Common, LeBron James, Gina Rodriguez, Danny DeVito, Yara Shahidi, Ely Henry and Jimmy Tatro. The plot follows a tribe of Himalayan Yeti who come across a human being, with each species thinking the other was just a myth.

Smallfoot was theatrically released in the United States on September 28, 2018. It received a mostly positive reception from critics and grossed over $214 million at the box office.

Plot

A village of Yetis live in isolation on the top of a mountain in the Himalayas, above the clouds and hidden away from sight. Migo is a yeti who abides by the law of the ancient stones held by the Stonekeeper, the yetis' leader. Migo's father, Dorgle, projects himself through the air each morning to hit a gong with his head, as the yetis believe this wakes up the sun. While learning how to ring the gong, Migo is distracted by the Stonekeeper's daughter, Meechee, whom he has a crush on, and misses the gong, landing outside the village. There, Migo witnesses a plane crash and finds a "smallfoot" (human), whom the yetis believe is mythical. Migo runs back to inform the villagers, but he lacks proof, and Stonekeeper claims he is lying and banishes him from the village. Migo is suddenly visited by rejected yetis Gwangi, Kolka, and Fleem, who do not believe in the stones, and bring him to the Smallfoot Evidentiary Society (S.E.S.), which is led by Meechee. She convinces Migo to travel below the clouds despite the stones telling them that there is nothing underneath. After some hesitation, Migo agrees to go, but his rope snaps and Migo falls, where he discovers land.

Percy Patterson is a British human filmmaker of wildlife documentaries who has lost most of his viewership. He meets the pilot who saw Migo, and in an attempt to regain his fame, tries unsuccessfully to convince his assistant, Brenda, to dress up as a yeti for filming. Migo arrives and unknowingly scares Percy when trying to communicate with him due to yeti's and human's inability to understand each other. When Migo inadvertently terrifies Percy by his attempted communication, Percy attempts to tranquilize Migo. However the errant dart ends up hitting Percy, rendering him temporarily unconscious. Migo then decides to abduct the unconscious Percy by stuffing him into a sleeping bag that he straps to his chest for the return trip home.

During the long trek back up the mountain, Migo and Percy encounter a severe blizzard which blows them into a nearby cave. Migo discovers that Percy has frozen completely solid. He quickly lights a fire and ties Percy up over a fire to thaw him out and save his life. As Percy regains consciousness, he believes that Migo is trying to cook him alive. Percy breaks free from the rope and proceeds to film and upload a cell phone video of Migo while narrating that the yeti is threatening to eat him, before attempting to escape. While chasing after Percy, Migo's toe becomes ensnared in a bear trap and Percy takes pity on Migo by removing the trap and bandaging his wound. Realizing that the yeti is trying to communicate with him, Percy agrees to go with Migo and they head back up the mountain overnight, where they reunite with the S.E.S. the next morning.

The yetis are confused by Percy's appearance, but happily embrace him and learn about his culture, much to Stonekeeper's dismay. Later, Stonekeeper takes Migo inside the palace and reveals the truth: yetis used to live below the clouds, but were forced into hiding by the vicious humans who mercilessly attacked them. To keep themselves safe, the yetis created the stones, and the clouds are actually steam made by the yetis' daily tasks to keep them hidden from the humans below. Meanwhile, Meechee is able to develop a rudimentary line of communication with Percy by referring to crude chalk drawings that Percy scribbles on her cave wall. In order to protect the yeti village, Migo agrees to continue Stonekeeper's lie by telling the yetis that Percy, who is now experiencing altitude sickness, is just a hairless wild yak. Stonekeeper takes Percy and locks him in an ice box, so Percy will be unable to alert other humans of the yetis' whereabouts. Migo later discovers that Meechee took Percy away to return him home, and jumps down the mountain with Gwangi and Kolka following suit.

Percy recovers and discovers that his video of Migo has generated significant public excitement, but then notices that Meechee has become distracted by the wonders of Kathmandu and accidentally causes a public disruption. Meechee is attacked by the police, but is rescued by Gwangi, Kolka and Migo. As Migo tries to explain to Meechee that humans are monsters, they see a mural depicting a yeti attacking people and realize that humans view them as monsters. The yetis try to make it back to the mountain, but are chased by a SWAT helicopter that Stonekeeper takes down using his stones. Migo attempts to divert the police away from the other yetis, when Percy arrives on his snowmobile and shoots Migo with a tranquilizer gun to protect him. The police chase and capture Percy in his yeti suit, and arrest him for public disturbance and fraud.

Back at the village, inside the palace, Migo explains the truth to the yetis and apologizes for lying to them. He tells the others that even though humans may still be scared of the yetis, they should try to communicate with them. The yetis leave the village, and when Percy and Brenda notice them, they emerge from the crowd and stand up for the yetis. The rest of the humans slowly welcome the yetis and accept them into their lives.

Voice cast
 Channing Tatum as Migo, a young yeti who is determined to prove the existence of the Smallfoot.
 James Corden as Percy Patterson, a British human filmmaker of wildlife documentaries trying to get back in the spotlight, who becomes Migo's Smallfoot best friend.
 Zendaya as Meechee, a young yeti, the Stonekeeper's daughter, Thorp's younger sister, the leader of S.E.S., and Migo's love interest.
 Common as Stonekeeper, the condescending yeti chief and father of Thorp and Meechee.
 LeBron James as Gwangi, a large purple yeti who is part of the S.E.S.
 Gina Rodriguez as Kolka, a yeti who is part of the S.E.S.
 Danny DeVito as Dorgle, a short yeti who is the village gong ringer and Migo's widowed father.
 Yara Shahidi as Brenda, Percy's morally conscious assistant, who does not believe in yetis until the end of the film.
 Ely Henry as Fleem, a small yeti who is part of the S.E.S.
 Jimmy Tatro as Thorp, a slow-witted yeti who is the Stonekeeper's son and Meechee's older brother.
 Patricia Heaton as Mama Bear, a himalayan brown bear Migo and Percy encounter in a cave while waiting out a blizzard. In the UK release, the part of Mama Bear was performed by Emma Bunton. 
 Justin Roiland as Garry, a paranoid yeti.
 Jack Quaid as Pilot, a human airplane pilot who crashes on the mountain and who Migo first meets.

Additional voices are provided by Kelly Holden Bashar, Jonathan Kite, Joel McCrary, Clare Sera, Jessica Tuck, Peter Ettinger, Jonathan Mangum, Vanessa Ragland, Luke Smith, and Rick Zieff.

Production

Writers Glenn Ficarra and John Requa conceived of Smallfoot, interested in a story about Yeti or Bigfoot; they drew inspiration from an original idea by Sergio Pablos.

The concept for Smallfoot was in development before director Karey Kirkpatrick joined the project in July 2016; he viewed an animatic in which Percy was a "ski bum type" with no motivation on his personality in the first drafts of the script and repetitive gag lines, and so they added more elements in his later revisions by giving arc and depth to his character. Kirkpatrick also said Meechee was undeveloped, and she was made head of the S.E.S. in rewrites. Observing Brexit and a rise in nationalism, Kirkpatrick also drew inspiration:

On May 11, 2017, it was announced that the film was in-production with Channing Tatum, Zendaya, and Gina Rodriguez providing the lead voice roles. Ely Henry was originally hired as a scratch vocal for the film four years before its release, however was later invited to join the cast and subsequently voiced Fleem in the final product. The film was animated by Sony Pictures Imageworks, who had also provided animation for the Warner Animation Group's Storks, and utilized Autodesk Maya for the animation process. Ryan O'Loughlin, a DreamWorks Animation veteran, was originally the film's director, but was replaced by Kirkpatrick.

Music
The score for the film was composed by Heitor Pereira. The songs were written by Karey Kirkpatrick and his brother Wayne Kirkpatrick. The film originally had no songs until six months into production when the suggestion of making the film a musical came from Toby Emmerich, who was recently elected as chairman of the Warner Bros. Pictures Group at the time, partially because the Kirkpatrick brothers had previously written the music and lyrics for the Tony-winning Broadway musical Something Rotten!.

The songs include "Perfection" performed by Channing Tatum, "Wonderful Life" performed by Zendaya, "Percy's Pressure" performed by James Corden (music from the song "Under Pressure", additional lyrics by Karey and Wayne Kirkpatrick), "Wonderful Questions" performed by Tatum & Zendaya, "Let It Lie" performed by Common, "Moment of Truth" performed by CYN, and "Finally Free" perfromed by Niall Horan (written by Horan, Ian Franzino, Andrew Hass, John Ryan and Julian Bunetta).

The soundtrack peaked at number 8 on the Billboard 200. The song "Finally Free" peaked a couple of Billboard charts including number 39 on Mexico Ingles Airplay chart and number 2 on Bandsintown X Billboard Top Livestream Artists chart.

Release
The film was released on September 28, 2018.

Marketing
In late summer 2018, American pizza chain Chuck E. Cheese's announced that they would be the official partner of the film. Marketing materials for the film, in particular a series of posters in Los Angeles advertising the cast of the film with phrases such as "Zendaya is Meechee", turned into a minor Internet meme (in a short song by Gabriel Gundacker).

Home media
Smallfoot was released on Digital on iTunes, Movies Anywhere, Microsoft Store, Vudu, and Amazon Prime on December 4, 2018, and on DVD, Blu-ray, Blu-Ray 3D, 4K Ultra and Digital Copy on December 11, 2018. The releases also included a short film, titled Super Soozie.

Reception

Box office
Smallfoot grossed $83.2 million in the United States and Canada, and $130.9 million in other territories, for a total worldwide gross of $214.1 million.

In the United States and Canada, Smallfoot was released alongside Night School, Little Women and Hell Fest, and was projected to gross $25–30 million from 4,131 theaters in its opening weekend. The film made $6.5 million on its first day, including $850,000 from Thursday night previews, more than the Warner Animation Group's previous September release Storks ($435,000 in 2016). It went on to debut to $23 million, finishing second at the box office behind Night School. It made $14.3 million in its second weekend and $9.1 million in its third, dropping 37% each time and finishing third and fifth, respectively.

Critical response
The website's critical consensus reads, "Smallfoot offers a colorful distraction that should keep younger viewers entertained - and a story whose message might even resonate with older audiences." On Metacritic, the film has a weighted average score of 60 out of 100, based on 25 critics, indicating "mixed or average reviews". Audiences polled by CinemaScore gave the film an average grade of "A−" on an A+ to F scale, while PostTrak reported filmgoers gave it 4 out of 5 stars.

Accolades

Possible sequel
In September 2018, writers Glenn Ficarra and John Requa expressed hope for a sequel, with Requa stating that they "could make a whole other movie just on that shtick that we came up with". Ficarra added "Hopefully, we are lucky enough to be in that position. But you have to wait for the world to digest it to a certain extent... We have a myriad of ideas. Just in the discarded notions that we have entertained over the last 6 years."

In October 2018, on the subject of a sequel director Karey Kirkpatrick stated, "Haven't gone there yet, but you know it's really just the importance of truth. And the way to get to truth is by asking questions and never losing your sense of wonder and curiosity that leads to bridging a gap between the 'us' and the 'them'. I mean, we are often given misconceptions about things that make us different. And the only way to break through that is to question it and you won't question things without a sense of curiosity and wonder. So never lose that. All the songs basically have something to do with that."

See also
 The Son of Bigfoot
 Missing Link
 Abominable

References

External links

2010s American animated films
2010s children's animated films
American adventure comedy films
American children's animated adventure films
American children's animated comedy films
American children's animated musical films
American computer-animated films
American musical comedy films
2018 films
2018 3D films
2018 computer-animated films
Warner Bros. Animation animated films
Warner Bros. films
Warner Bros. animated films
Warner Animation Group films
Films about cryptids
Animated films about friendship
American animated feature films
Animated films based on children's books
2010s musical films
2010s musical comedy films
2010s monster movies
Films directed by Karey Kirkpatrick
Films scored by Heitor Pereira
Films set in Asia
Films set in the Himalayas
Animated films set in Kathmandu
Films with screenplays by Karey Kirkpatrick
Films about Yeti
3D animated films
2010s children's adventure films
2018 comedy films
Animated films set in Nepal
2010s English-language films